This is a list of notable film and television producers from Hungary.

G 
 György Gát
 Gábor N. Forgács

K 
 Zoltán Kamondi
 Ferenc Kardos
 Alexander Korda

M 
 Károly Makk

N 
 Britton Nagy

O
 Andrea Osvart

P 
 Gabriel Pascal

S 
 Endre Sík
 Sándor Simó

V 
 Gábor Varga

Lists of film producers

Film producers